Shaun Antony Rooney (born 26 July 1996) is a Scottish professional footballer who plays as a defender for Fleetwood Town. He has previously played for Queen's Park, Dunfermline Athletic, York City, Queen of the South, Inverness Caledonian Thistle and St Johnstone.

Career

Queen's Park
Rooney was born in Bellshill, North Lanarkshire. He started his career playing youth football with Bellshill Boys Club and Dundee United, before signing with Scottish League Two club Queen's Park in July 2013. Rooney's first-team debut came shortly after signing for the club, in a Scottish Challenge Cup defeat against Ayr United at Hampden Park. During the 2013–14 season, Rooney made 11 appearances for Queen's Park. His breakthrough season came in 2014–15, when he played in 30 matches, scoring his first goal on 15 November 2014 with a header against Elgin City in a 4–1 win. Rooney's impressive performances for Queen's Park saw him awarded the club's Young Player of the Year and also being named in the PFA Scotland Scottish League Two Team of the Year.

Dunfermline Athletic
The start of 2015–16 saw Rooney go on trial with both Hearts and St Mirren, however it was Dunfermline Athletic that he eventually signed with. Rooney appeared initially on trial with Dunfermline in August 2015 and was a named substitute against Peterhead and Stranraer, replacing Lewis Martin in defence against Stranraer. His debut after signing for the club came as a first half substitute against Ayr United, replacing Callum Fordyce after the Dunfermline captain was injured. Rooney's first goal for Dunfermline came against Stenhousemuir in December 2015, scoring the only goal in a 1–0 victory at East End Park. He made 14 appearances and scored one goal as Dunfermline won the Scottish League One title in 2015–16.

York City

Rooney joined newly relegated National League club York City on 23 May 2016 on a two-year contract. On 21 May 2017, Rooney came on as a 75th-minute substitute as York beat Macclesfield Town 3–2 at Wembley Stadium in the 2017 FA Trophy Final. Rooney completed 2016–17 with 38 appearances and one goal in all competitions while York were relegated to the National League North with a 21st-place finish in the table.

Queen of the South
Rooney signed for Scottish Championship club Queen of the South on 9 June 2017 on a one-year contract.

Inverness Caledonian Thistle
On 25 April 2018, Rooney signed a pre-contract agreement to join Scottish Championship club Inverness Caledonian Thistle on 1 June 2018 upon the expiration of his contract at Queen of the South. He made his debut on 14 July, starting in a 2–0 home win over Cove Rangers in the Scottish League Cup. He scored his first goal for Inverness on 1 September with a 51st-minute header from Tom Walsh's cross in a 3–0 away win over Dunfermline in the league.

St Johnstone
In June 2020, Rooney moved to St Johnstone on a two-year deal, having signed a pre-contract earlier in the year. On 28 February 2021 he scored the winning goal as St Johnstone beat Livingston 1–0 in the 2021 Scottish League Cup Final. On 22 May 2021, through a header in the 32nd minute Rooney scored the only goal of the 2021 Scottish Cup Final against Hibernian as St Johnstone won 1–0 at Hampden Park to complete a historic cup double, becoming the fifth player in the 21st century to score in both cup finals in the same season.

Fleetwood Town
Rooney signed for League One club Fleetwood Town on 25 May 2022 on a two-year contract.

Personal life
His great-uncle Benny Rooney was also a footballer, mainly with St Johnstone, and his great-grandfather Bob also played but was better known as a physiotherapist at Celtic.

Career statistics

Honours
Dunfermline Athletic
Scottish League One: 2015–16

York City
FA Trophy: 2016–17

St Johnstone
Scottish Cup: 2020–21
Scottish League Cup: 2020–21

Individual
PFA Scotland Team of the Year: 2014–15 Scottish League Two
Queen's Park Young Player of the Year: 2014–15

References

External links

Profile at the Fleetwood Town F.C. website

1996 births
Living people
Footballers from Bellshill
Scottish footballers
Association football defenders
Dundee United F.C. players
Queen's Park F.C. players
Dunfermline Athletic F.C. players
York City F.C. players
Queen of the South F.C. players
Inverness Caledonian Thistle F.C. players
St Johnstone F.C. players
Fleetwood Town F.C. players
Scottish Professional Football League players
National League (English football) players
English Football League players